Stiring-Wendel (Lorraine Franconian: Stiringe; German Stieringen-Wendel) is a commune in the Moselle department in Grand Est in north-eastern France, wedged between Forbach, Schœneck, Spicheren and Saarbrücken.

History
Charles de Wendel undertook construction of the very modern Stiring factory in 1846, mainly to manufacture railway rails. 
A coal extraction shaft was sunk near the factory buildings, and during the Second French Empire the Compagnie de Stiring sold coal to the Wendel company at generally favorable prices.
In 1865 the Wendel metallurgical factories were taking  of the output from the Compagnie de Stiring, paying below market prices.

Charles de Wendel and his partner Théodore de Gargan founded the city of Stiring-Wendel.
The workers' town, dominated by the factories and their managers, was a model that was followed in France into the 1930s.
Charles de Wendel initiated a policy of recruiting from the children of his workers, with son following father.
In the 1850s he began a system by which promotions would be assured, based on seniority, which encouraged loyalty.
The industrial family Wendel built a church, a school and residential facilities for the workers.

By imperial decree of Napoleon III, the city was elevated to a fully autonomous municipality on 3 June 1857, and separate from Forbach.
After the Franco-Prussian War of 1870, the city as part of Alsace-Lorraine came under German control. The steel industry collapsed with its final closure in 1897.
In 1897 the rise of the coal industry generated a new economy, and led to an increase in population. For example, in 1857 the population was 1900, where by 1957 it had grown to 16,000 residents.

After World War I, in 1918, Alsace-Lorraine get under french domination.

The Forbach and Stiring-Wendel area were heavy battlefields during World War II. Stiring-Wendel held many German POW camps to run the mines, which were liberated after the battles. Most of the armored American forces in this area turned north at this point to counter the German advance into Belgium ("Battle of the Bulge").

France began administering the German Saar region as a protectorate after World War II. The Marshall Plan returned the Saar to German control in 1957, due to both economic and political demands. The borders of Germany and France were then aligned to the positions before 1870, drawing the border line right next to Stiring-Wendel.

The people of Forbach and Stiring-Wendel are generally bi-lingual (French-German).

Population

Notable people from Stiring-Wendel
 Sophie Huber, Beijing 2008 Olympics swimmer (Born in Forbach)
 Patricia Kaas, Singer (Born in Forbach)
 Nicolas Untersteller, Famous Painter and member of Académie des Beaux-Arts
 Charles de Wendel, Industrialist, Founder

See also
 Communes of the Moselle department

References

Sources

External links

 Stiring-Wendel Official Web Site
 Stiring-Wendel Unofficial Web Site

Stiringwendel